Waipio Valley is a valley located in the Hamakua District of the Big Island of Hawaii. "Waipio" means "curved water" in the Hawaiian language.

The valley was the capital and permanent residence of many early Hawaiian Aliʻi (chiefs/kings) up until the time of King Umi. This was a place celebrated for its nioi tree (Eugenia reinwardtiana) known as the Nioi wela o Paakalana ("The burning Nioi of Paakalana"). It was the location of the ancient grass palace of the ancient "kings" of Hawaiʻi with the nioi stands. Kahekili II (king of Maui) raided Waipio in the 18th century and burned the four sacred trees to the ground. The first chief who had a court in this valley was called Kahaimoelea.

A steep road  leads down into the valley from a lookout point located on the top of the southern wall of the valley. Some portions of the road can reach up to a 45% grade, which would make Waipio Valley Road the steepest in the world, compared to Baldwin Street's 35%. This is a paved public road but it is open only to 4 wheel drive vehicles. It is the steepest road of its length in the United States. The shore line in the valley is a black sand beach, popular with surfers. A few taro farms are located in the valley. Several large waterfalls fall into the valley to feed the river which flows from the foot of the largest falls at the back of the valley out to the ocean.

A foot trail called Waimanu or Muliwai Trail leads down a steep path to the Waimanu Valley, which is only accessible by the trail or by boat. The trail is accessible to hikers, who need a Waimanu camping permit from the state unless they do the trek as a strenuous day hike. At the upper end of the valley, Waimanu Gap at  elevation leads to the south end of Waimanu Valley.

The valley was the site of the final scene in the 1995 sci-fi film Waterworld, at which the main characters found dry land.

Waipio Valley Road was closed to visitors from February 25, 2022, to September 19, 2022 "as a precautionary safety measure and to further assess and mitigate the road’s conditions".  Officials stated there was roadway and slope failure and the closure includes visitors both in vehicles and on foot. As of September 19, 2022, access to the valley floor with a covered 4WD vehicle is possible again for Big Island residents, county-permitted tour company operators and those seeking to practice their Native Hawaiian traditional or customary rights.

In Hawaiian folklore 
It has a role in local Hawaiian folklore as a place where the gateway to Lua-o-Milu (the Underworld) was hidden from view by sand.

References

External links

Getty Images Waipio Pictures

Canyons and gorges of Hawaii
Valleys of Hawaii
Landforms of Hawaii (island)
Royal residences in Hawaii
Beaches of Hawaii (island)
Black sand beaches